The 1920 All-Ireland Senior Hurling Championship Final was the 33rd All-Ireland Final and the culmination of the 1920 All-Ireland Senior Hurling Championship, an inter-county hurling tournament for the top teams in Ireland. The match was held at Croke Park, Dublin, on 2 May 1922, between Cork, represented by a selection of club players, and Dublin, represented by club side Faughs. The Munster champions lost to their Leinster opponents on a score line of 4-9 to 4-3.

Match details

1
All-Ireland Senior Hurling Championship Finals
Cork county hurling team matches
Dublin GAA matches
All-Ireland Senior Hurling Championship Final
All-Ireland Senior Hurling Championship Final, 1920